Basen may refer to:
Basen, Armenia, village in Armenia
Basen Górniczy, neighborhood of Szczecin, Poland
Basen, Podlaskie Voivodeship, town in Poland
Ba Sen, Chinese-Mongol actor, descendant of Chagatai

See also
 Basin (disambiguation)